Shah Cement Industries Limited is a Bangladeshi building materials company headquartered in Dhaka, Bangladesh. As of 2019, The company holds the highest share (14%) of the cement market in Bangladesh. It is the largest cement plant in Bangladesh in terms of production capacity. It is a subsidiary of Abul Khair Group.

History 
Shah Cement was founded in 2002 by Abul Khair Group in Munshiganj, Dhaka with an initial capacity of 5.2 million metric tons per annum. It also established its own power plant with the capacity of 17 megawatt.

In 2018, the company installed and commissioned a 15,000 tonnes capacity vertical roller mill (VRM) in its plant, supplied by Danish company FLSmidth. The roller mill was recognized as world's largest vertical roller mill by Guinness World Record.

The company received "Best Brand Award" from Kantar Millward Brown and Bangladesh Brand Forum in 2010, 2016 and 2017 in building materials category.

Controversy
In 2017, Bangladesh National Board of Revenue accused the company of VAT deceit of BDT 0.9 Billion.

References 

Cement companies of Bangladesh
Organisations based in Dhaka
Manufacturing companies based in Dhaka
Bangladeshi companies established in 2002
Manufacturing companies established in 2002